The 2017 Cyprus Women's Cup was the tenth edition of the Cyprus Women's Cup, an invitational women's football tournament held annually in Cyprus.

Format
The tournament consisted of a group stage, held over three match days followed by a single day of classification matches to determine the final standings.

For the group stage, the twelve teams were split into three groups of four teams. Each group played a round-robin tournament with each team playing one match against each other team in its group.

Venues

Teams

Squads

Group stage

Group A

Group B

Group C

Place matches stage

Eleventh place match

Ninth place match

Seventh place match

Fifth place match

Third place match

Final

Final standings

References

External links
Official website

2017
2017 in women's association football
2016–17 in Cypriot football
Cyprus Women's Cup